Cowper may refer to:
 Cowper (surname), people with the surname
 Earl Cowper, an extinct title in the peerage of Great Britain
 Cowper, New South Wales, a town in New South Wales, Australia
 Division of Cowper, an electoral district in the Australian House of Representatives, in New South Wales
 Cowper County, New South Wales
 Cowper House, Chester, England
 Cowper stove, a regenerative heat exchanger

From the "William Cowper" disambiguation:

 William Cowper (1731–1800), English poet and hymnodist
 William Cowper (doctor) (1701–1767) English doctor and antiquarian
 William Cowper (anatomist) (1666–1709), English anatomist; eponym of Cowper's gland and Cowper's fluid
 William Couper (bishop) (1568–1619), Scottish bishop
 Sir William Cowper, 2nd Baronet, MP for Hertford, father of William Cowper, 1st Earl Cowper
 William Cowper, 1st Earl Cowper (c. 1665–1723), Lord Chancellor of England
 William Cowper (Archdeacon of Cumberland) (1778–1858), Anglican priest in Australia, father of the below
 William Cowper (Dean of Sydney) (1810–1902), Anglican priest in Australia, son of the above
 William Cowper-Temple, 1st Baron Mount Temple (1811–1888), British politician and courtier
 William Cowper (1853-1918), British stage and film actor

See also
 Bulbourethral gland or Cowper's gland, a component of the reproductive system of human males
 Cooper (profession); cowper is an old English spelling of cooper (a maker or repairer of casks and barrels)
 Pre-ejaculate or Cowper's fluid, the clear fluid emitted when a man is sexually aroused
 William Cowper (disambiguation)